KNMQ-LD (channel 20) is a low-power television station in Albuquerque, New Mexico, United States. Owned by RJ Enterprises, the station maintains a transmitter on Sandia Crest.

KNMQ-LD previously operated as a translator of Santa Fe–licensed religious independent station KCHF (channel 11, owned by Son Broadcasting), providing easier reception in areas of Albuquerque where a quality signal from KCHF's main transmitter near Los Alamos is not available. Since 2021, it now airs programming independent from KCHF. On September 1, 2021, the KCHF relay on 20.5 moved to KYNM-CD 21.5, while a new local sports channel launched on digital channel 20.5.

History
This station was originally K45DL broadcasting on UHF channel 45 beginning sometime in 1995. It was an America's Store affiliate until 2005. The broadcast on channel 45 ended in 2002 to make way for the digital broadcast for KASY-TV. It moved to channel 43 in early 2003 and changed the callsign to K43HW.

By 2008, K43HW would not broadcast any programming over the next few years: the station was silent displaying the color bars. Later, it would shut down its transmitter entirely.

On March 28, 2011, it was granted a construction permit to flash cut to digital broadcasting. The station was sold to RJ Enterprises by Joseph W. Shaffer in late 2011. An FCC application states that the new owners are planning to move the station's transmitter site and possibly move to a different channel position. On June 6, 2012, it was granted a permit modification to move its transmitter to Sandia Crest, where most of the area's television stations broadcast from. On December 19, 2012, the station began broadcasting its digital signal, airing only audio from KDAZ radio, which was also heard at the time on KYNM-LD channel 30.730. The channel went back off the air in mid-January 2013.

On January 23, 2013, the station changed its call sign to K43HW-D. On February 21, 2013, the call sign again changed to KNMQ-LD. On May 24, 2013 the station had applied to the FCC to remain silent while the broadcast tower was undergoing modifications.

In early May 2014, the station went back on the air, relaying KCHF programming.

Technical information

Subchannels
The station's digital signal is multiplexed:

References

External links
 

NMQ-LD
Television channels and stations established in 1995
WeatherNation TV affiliates
Classic Reruns TV affiliates
1995 establishments in New Mexico
Low-power television stations in the United States